Allsboro is a populated place in Colbert County, Alabama, United States.

History
Allsboro was settled in the mid-19th century and named for the family of Bradley Alsobrook. A post office was established in Allsboro in 1851, though another source stated it was first established from 1848-1866 and resumed again from 1872 until being discontinued in 1955.

Demographics

Allsboro

Allsboro first appeared on the 1880 U.S. Census as an unincorporated village. It did not appear separately as a village again. For precinct, see below.

Historic Demographics

Allsboro Precinct (1890-1950)

The Allsboro Beat/Precinct (Colbert County 15th Precinct) first appeared on the 1890 U.S. Census. The village of Allsboro had previously been in the 6th beat (Dickson) in 1880 and the new 15th beat was subdivided from it. The Allsboro Precinct continued to report until 1950. In 1960, the precinct was merged as part of a larger reorganization of counties into the census division of Cherokee.

Gallery
Below are photographs taken in Allsboro as part of the Historic American Buildings Survey:

References

Notes

References

Unincorporated communities in Alabama
Unincorporated communities in Colbert County, Alabama
Populated places established in 1851
1851 establishments in Alabama